Jones government may refer to:
First Jones government, the Welsh Assembly Government led by Carwyn Jones from 2009 to 2011
Second Jones government, the Welsh Government led by Carwyn Jones from 2011 to 2016
Third Jones government, the Welsh Government led by Carwyn Jones from 2016 to 2018